The 2017 Munster Under-25 Reserve Hurling Competition was the first staging of the Munster Under-25 Reserve Hurling Competition. The competition began on 4 June 2017 and ended on 18 June 2017.

Teams

Participants

Prior to the opening of the competition, the Cork and Tipperary teams withdrew. This resulted in just three teams remaining, with Waterford receiving a bye to the final.

Individual details

Results

Semi-final

Final

Scoring statistics

Top scorers overall

Top scorers in a single game

References

Munster Under-25 Hurling Championship